Helicopsis striata is a species of air-breathing land snail, terrestrial pulmonate gastropod mollusk in the family Geomitridae. 

Helicopsis striata is the type species of the genus Helicopsis.

Subspecies
Until 2018 there where three subspecies within this species and they included:
 Helicopsis striata austriacaE. Gittenberger, 1969  - mentioned in annex II of Habitats Directive : synonym of Helicopsis austriaca E. Gittenberger, 1969 (invalid combination)
 Helicopsis striata hungarica: synonym of Helicopsis hungarica (Soós & H. Wagner, 1935) (invalid combination)
 Helicopsis striata striata O. F. Müller, 1774)
Since 2018 H. austriaca and H. hungarica are listed as separate species.

Distribution

This species occurs in Central Europe only, including:
 Germany
 Austria - main distribution in Steinfeld, Lower Austria
 Sweden
 The Czech Republic - Bohemia, locally extinct in Moravia
 Slovakia
 Poland

Populations from Ukraine, Moldova, Romania and Russia that were previously considered to be H. striata are actually representing Helicopsis lunulata (Krynicki, 1833) or in some cases Helicopsis filimargo (Krynicki, 1833).

References

 Bank, R. A.; Neubert, E. (2017). Checklist of the land and freshwater Gastropoda of Europe. Last update: July 16th, 2017
 Hausdorf, B. (1990). Zur Kenntnis einiger Arten der Gattung Helicopsis Fitzinger aus Griechenland und der Türkei (Gastropoda: Hygromiidae). Archiv für Molluskenkunde, 120 (1/3) [1989]: 57-71. Frankfurt am Main
  Sysoev, A. V. & Schileyko, A. A. (2009). Land snails and slugs of Russia and adjacent countries. Sofia/Moskva (Pensoft). 312 pp., 142 plates

External links
 Müller, O. F. (1774). Vermium terrestrium et fluviatilium, seu animalium infusorium, Helminthicorum, et testaceorum, non marinorum, succincta historia. vol 2: I-XXXVI, 1-214, 10 unnumbered pages. Havniae et Lipsiae, apud Heineck et Faber, ex officina Molleriana.
 Working group Alpine land snails: Small heath snails – major questions: Initial attempts to clarify the situation of Helicopsis striata in Austria

Geometridae
Gastropods described in 1774
Taxa named by Otto Friedrich Müller